Powergaming (power gaming, min maxing or optimization) is a style of interacting with games or game-like systems, particularly video games, boardgames, and, role-playing games, with the aim of maximizing progress towards a specific goal. Other players may consider this disruptive when done to the exclusion of all other considerations, such as storytelling, atmosphere, and camaraderie. When focusing on the letter of the rules over the spirit of the rules, it is often seen as unsporting, un-fun, or unsociable. This behavior is most often found in games with a wide range of game features, lengthy campaigns, or prize tournaments such as massively multiplayer or collectible games.

Description 
Powergaming in roleplaying games can take several forms. One form is the deliberate creation of optimal player characters (PCs), with the aim of maximising the power the player wields in the game world. This is known as min-maxing, due to the practice of maximising desirable or "powerful" traits while minimising underpowered or less useful traits. Such characters often draw criticism for not fitting the theme and tone of the game world or for being difficult to challenge. Another form of powergaming involves a focus on acquiring power during game progression, often by acquiring powerful equipment or unusual abilities. This lends itself to gameplay which is materialistic (and often, in the context of the game world, arguably immoral) and can frustrate other players who are looking to interact with the game world, score points, and not merely acquire game resources. Another term for a powergamer is a munchkin, who may be differentiated from normal powergamers to describe players who seek to acquire power and loot at the expense and disregard of their teammates.

In online text-based role-playing games that emphasize collaborative role-play over acquiring levels or skills, players can be described powergamers if they presume or declare that their own action against another player character is successful without giving the other player character the freedom to act on their own prerogative. They may also be a player who tries to force others to participate in unwanted role-playing. For instance, a player who unilaterally describes his character as doing something with (or to) another character that would usually require the other to play along — such as having a fight or a sexual encounter — is considered to be powergaming. In such games, in which a sense of community and rapport between players is seen as crucial and conducive to the game's overall well-being, powergaming is generally regarded as extremely offensive behaviour if it is not stated in the rules as being a punishable offense (including, but not limited to, banning). It is often seen as synonymous with twinking or godmoding.

In video games, powergamers enjoy being at the bleeding edge of progression of their selected game, taking part in every activity that yields the fastest progression, and bypassing the "lesser" activities or any other secondary job, trait, or skill. This is a wide generalization, however. A player that likes to maximise all aspects of the game and do so in an expedient manner is also classified as a powergamer, often seeing more of the world than the "average" player would.

See also
Gamesmanship
Powerleveling
Min-maxing
Twinking

References

External links
 Roll-playing vs. Roleplaying on TopMudSites, by Wes Platt. An article on the basics of role-play as opposed to 'roll-play' in text-based environments.
 A Powergamer's guide to Life, a satire in which real life is treated as an online game to be powergamed.

Competition
Role-playing game terminology
Video game gameplay